Chimanbhai is a given name. Notable people with the name include:

Chimanbhai Patel (1929–1994), Indian politician
Chimanbhai Mehta, Indian politician 
Chinubhai Chimanbhai (1901–1993), former Mayor of Ahmedabad
Urmilaben Chimanbhai Patel, Indian politician